Otávio Gut Oliveira (born 19 June 1996), commonly known as Gut, is a Brazilian footballer who plays as a centre-back for Figueirense.

Club career
Born in Jundiaí, Gut started his career with Atlético Mineiro. After stints at Paulista, Nacional-SP and Francana in the lower divisions of the Campeonato Paulista, he signed for Comercial-SP in 2018.

After three seasons with Comercial, Gut left São Paulo and joined Anápolis-GO. However, he did not immediately settle into the team, and was loaned to Portuguese side Farense in July 2021.

On 22 November 2022, Gut signed a contract with Figueirense for the 2023 season.

Career statistics

Club

Notes

References

1996 births
People from Jundiaí
Footballers from São Paulo (state)
Living people
Brazilian footballers
Association football defenders
Clube Atlético Mineiro players
Paulista Futebol Clube players
Nacional Atlético Clube (SP) players
Associação Atlética Francana players
Comercial Futebol Clube (Ribeirão Preto) players
Anápolis Futebol Clube players
S.C. Farense players
Esporte Clube XV de Novembro (Piracicaba) players
Figueirense FC players
Liga Portugal 2 players
Campeonato Catarinense players
Brazilian expatriate footballers
Brazilian expatriate sportspeople in Portugal
Expatriate footballers in Portugal